David Glyn Vaughan OBE (23 October 1962 – 9 February 2023) was a climate scientist at the British Antarctic Survey. His research focus is the role of ice sheets in the Earth system and the societal threat of climate change and rising sea levels. He is a co-ordinating Lead Author of the IPCC Fourth Assessment Report. His research work includes the mapping of the bed under Pine Island Glacier and the discovery of a subglacial volcano. Between March 2009 and November 2013 Vaughan led the EU Ice2sea project, which focussed on sea-level rise arising from ice-sheet and glacier melt.

Vaughan graduated from Churchill College, Cambridge with a degree in Natural Sciences in 1984. He then earned a MSc in Geophysics from Durham University (Hatfield College) in 1985, after which he joined the British Antarctic Survey, taking part in multiple field campaigns over the following years.  He gained his PhD from the Open University in 1995. He was appointed Officer of the Order of the British Empire (OBE) in the 2017 New Year Honours for services to glaciology. He died of stomach cancer on 9 February 2023, at the age of 60.

References

External links 
 British Antarctic Survey Staff Directory and Profiles

1962 births
2023 deaths 
Deaths from stomach cancer
British climatologists
Intergovernmental Panel on Climate Change lead authors
Officers of the Order of the British Empire
Alumni of Hatfield College, Durham
Alumni of Churchill College, Cambridge